Mount Skeidskneet is a mountain,  high, surmounting the east side of the head of Humboldt Graben at the southwest extremity of the Petermann Ranges, Wohlthat Mountains, in Queen Maud Land in Antarctica. It was discovered and photographed by the German Antarctic Expedition (1938–39), mapped by Norway from air photos and surveys by the Norwegian Antarctic Expedition (1956–60), and named Skeidskneet.

Mountains of Queen Maud Land
Princess Astrid Coast